La Tranche-sur-Mer (literally La Tranche on Sea) is a commune in the Vendée department in the Pays de la Loire region in western France.

The final stages of the action of 30 June 1798, during which all three combatant frigates grounded, was fought just off the harbour.

See also
Communes of the Vendée department

References

Communes of Vendée
Populated coastal places in France